Silver needle noodle, rat noodle, bee tai bak, runny nose vermicilli()  or lot,  Giam Ee is a variety of Chinese noodles. It is short, about 5 cm long and 5 mm in diameter. It has a white semi-transparent colour.  The noodle is available in many Chinese markets in Chinese populated areas such as Hong Kong, Taiwan, Cambodia, Indonesia, Malaysia , Thailand, Vietnam and Singapore.

Names
Quite a number of names have been used to describe the noodle. The noodle is more commonly known as silver needle noodle in Hong Kong and Taiwan, and rat noodle or "mouse tail noodles" in Malaysia and Singapore. They are sometimes also called as pin noodles. The noodles are named as such because the shape of the noodles is long and tapered much like a rat's tail, translucent white like needles, or from the way the noodles are made by pushing them through the holes of a sieve.

Production
The noodles are made from a mixture of ground rice flour from glutinous or non-glutinous rice and water, but sometimes combined with cornstarch to reduce breakage during cooking. The noodles are made by pushing the rice and water mixture through a sieve directly into boiling water in the same manner as Spätzle. The noodles are made beforehand and then further prepared before serving. The noodles are only available fresh and they are made by noodle vendors or commercially produced and seldom homemade as it is too tedious to make a small amount for home consumption.

Preparation

The noodles may be stir-fried, scalded and flavored with a mixture of sauces, cooked in soup or cooked dry in a clay-pot. As with most Chinese noodles, it can be served for breakfast, lunch or dinner as a main course or supplementing a rice meal. Many Chinese restaurants, hawkers and roadside stalls serve the noodle in various forms. One of the famous dishes that can be found widely in Southeast Asia is Clay-Pot Lao Shu Fen. The purpose of using clay-pot is to keep warmth of the dish.

See also

 Chinese noodles
 Lai fun
 Rice noodles

External links
2010-07-13 草嶺清涼系列-2~米苔目
康樂社區遊客米苔目DIY 
【MUJO趴趴走--宜蘭三星銀柳節】2012手工米台目製作體驗.食譜&實作

References

Chinese noodles